Yunnan Adventure with Nigel Marven is one-hour British nature documentary made by Image Impact production company for Eden Channel and Yunnan TV, which was first broadcast in February 2012.

In the program, wildlife presenter and adventurer Nigel Marven travels amongst mountains of Yunnan Province in southern China in search of selected species of animals, including hoolock gibbon, one of the most endangered primates on Earth.

List of animals featured in the program 
 Green peacock
 Black snub-nosed monkey
 Eight-lined keelback
 Chinese giant salamander
 Bear macaque
 Chinese beauty snake
 Red panda
 Black-breasted leaf turtle
 Indian giant flying squirrel
 Asian black bear
 Hoolock gibbon
 Black-necked crane

Links 
 Fremantle Brand

Nature educational television series